The British Independent Film Awards 2020 were held in early February 2021 to recognise the best in British independent cinema and filmmaking talent from United Kingdom. The nominations were announced on 9 December 2020  with Saint Maud leading with 17 nominations, followed by Rocks and His House with 16 each.

Winners and nominees

Films with multiple nominations and awards

Films with multiple awards

References

External links
Official website

2020 film awards
British Independent Film Awards